Eric Meyer (born August 23, 1966) is an American musician who is best known as the guitarist for the Los Angeles based thrash metal band Dark Angel, which he joined in 1984, and played on all of their albums from We Have Arrived onwards.

Following the breakup of Dark Angel he worked as a producer, including on albums by Transmetal.

References

1966 births
Living people
American heavy metal guitarists
Dark Angel (band) members
American male guitarists
20th-century American guitarists
20th-century American male musicians